The 1966 Gent–Wevelgem was the 28th edition of the Gent–Wevelgem cycle race and was held on 23 March 1966. The race started in Ghent and finished in Wevelgem. The race was won by Herman Van Springel of the Dr. Mann team.

General classification

References

Gent–Wevelgem
1966 in road cycling
1966 in Belgian sport
March 1966 sports events in Europe